The Dead Has Arisen is the debut studio album by American rapper Lil' ½ Dead from Long Beach, California. It was released on October 25, 1994 through Priority Records. Recording sessions took place at Westlake Audio in Los Angeles and at Total Trak Sound with producers Courtney Branch and Tracy Kendrick. It features guest appearances from Chaos and Quicc 2 Mac of Hostyle, Tha Chill of Compton's Most Wanted, AMG and X-Con. The album peaked at number 39 on the Top R&B/Hip-Hop Albums chart and number 17 on the Top Heatseekers chart in the United States.

The album has been both praised and criticized for its likeness to Lil' ½ Dead's Long Beach friend Warren G's debut album Regulate...G Funk Era. Whilst it failed to achieve similar success to its predecessors Dr. Dre's The Chronic and Snoop Dogg's Doggystyle, it did achieve nationwide and international fans, and Lil' ½ Dead has been recognized as responsible for introducing and popularizing the smooth, laid-back rapping style along with Snoop Dogg and Warren G.

Track listing

Charts

References

External links

1994 debut albums
Lil' ½ Dead albums
Priority Records albums
Albums produced by Courtney Branch